The 2022–23 Russian Cup is the 31st season of the Russian football knockout tournament since the dissolution of the Soviet Union.
The competition started on 16 August 2022 and will conclude on 11 June 2023. 

The winner of the cup would normally win entry into the 2023–24 UEFA Europa League; however, on 28 February 2022, Russian football clubs were suspended from FIFA & UEFA international competitions on 2022–23 season.

Representation of clubs by league
 Russian Premier League (1): 16 clubs
 Russian First League (2): 17 clubs (without 1 farm team)
 Russian Second League (3): 59 clubs (without 13 farm teams)
 Amateur leagues:
 Third division (4): 5
 Fourth division (regional leagues) (5): 4
 Media amateur clubs (6): 2
 Total: 103 clubs.

Distribution
The teams of Premier League and the other teams will qualify to knockout phase in two different paths. Premier league teams will play in the RPL path group stage with a double round-robin tournament, divided into 4 groups with 4 teams in each group, while the other teams will play in the regions path qualification, starting with 1/256 round until 1/8 round with 1 match in each stage.

Round dates
The schedule of the competition is as follows.

Qualifying round (regions path)

Round 1 
The draw for rounds 1, 2 and 3 was held on 11 August 2022, 18:00.
Entered clubs:
 10 clubs from Amateur leagues
 14 lowest clubs from Russian Second League
Times are MSK (UTC+3), as listed by RFU (local times, if different, are in parentheses).

Round 2 
The draw for round 2 defining home and away team was held on 19 August 2022. Date of matches was determined on 24 August 2022.
Entered clubs:
 12 winners of round 1
 1 club from Amateur leagues
 43 remaining clubs from Russian Second League (except Rotor Volgograd and Metallurg Lipetsk)
Times are (UTC+3), as listed by RFU (local times, if different, are in parentheses).

Round 3 
The draw for round 3 defining home and away team was held on 2 September 2022. Date of matches was determined on 24 August 2022.
Entered clubs:
 28 winners of round 2
 2 highest clubs from Russian Second League (Rotor Volgograd and Metallurg Lipetsk)
Times are MSK (UTC+3), as listed by RFU (local times, if different, are in parentheses).

Round 4 
The draw was held on 18 September 2022 at 13:00 MSK live on TV-channel «Match! Premier». Date of matches was determined on 27 September 2022.
Entered clubs:
 15 winners of round 3
 17 clubs from Russian First League

On 16 September draw procedure was released, that consisted of 2 phases. On the first phase 1 random ball with First League team from pot 2 was relocated to pot 1, then on the second phase usual draw procedure started. The teams from pot 1 played their matches in round 4 at home.

The team from pot 2 that was replocated to pot 1 is written in italics. The team was unknown until it will be drawn from pot 1.

Times are MSK (UTC+3), as listed by RFU (local times, if different, are in parentheses).

Round 5 
The draw was held on 7 October 2022 at 20:00 MSK live on TV-channel «Match! Premier». Date of matches was determined on 24 October 2022.
Times are MSK (UTC+3), as listed by RFU (local times, if different, are in parentheses).

Round 6 
The draw was held on 2 November 2022 at 21:00 MSK live on TV-channel «Match! Premier».Date of matches was determined on 8 November 2022.
Times are MSK (UTC+3), as listed by RFU (local times, if different, are in parentheses).

Group stage (RPL path) 
The draw for group stage was held on 17 August 2022 in 20:30 MSK (UTC+3) live on TV-channel «Match TV».

16 teams of the Russian Premier League (RPL) will start the tournament from the group stage (4 teams in each group). The teams will play 6 matches in the group stage:
 1st day – 30–31 August;
 2nd day – 13–14 September;
 3rd day – 28–29 September;
 4th day – 18–20 October;
 5th day – 16, 22–23 November;
 6th day – 26–27 November.
On 12 August released composition of the pots. It is based on results of the 2021–22 Russian Premier League and 2021–22 Russian Football National League. In the same group there can't be more than 2 teams from Moscow and Moscow oblast, also FC Krasnodar, FC Rostov and Fakel Voronezh can't be in the same group due to logistics restrictions in this cities.

Times are MSK (UTC+3), as listed by RFU (local times, if different, are in parentheses).

Group A

Group B

Group C

Group D

Knockout phase 
In the knockout phase, as in the qualification, the teams will be divided into 2 paths (brackets). 

The teams in RPL path (upper bracket) will play against each other over two legs on a home-and-away basis. The teams that will lose after 2 legs in RPL path will have the second chance in the regions path. 

The teams in the regions path (lower bracket) will play against each other in 1 match. Each round consists of 2 phases. In the quarter-finals first phase teams from the regions path qualification will play against the third placed team of RPL path group stage, then on the second stage they will play against RPL path quarter-finals loser. In the semi-finals and finals first phases the teams play with winners of the previous round of the regions path, the second phase is the same as in quarter-finals.

The winners of both paths will play in super final in June 2023 at Luzhniki stadium.

Quarter-finals 
The draw was held on 3 December 2022 at 16:30 MSK live on TV-channel «Match TV».

In the quarter-final matches of RPL path teams from same group can't play with each other. Runners-up of group stage will play first matches at home. Winners of regions path round 6 will play stage 1 matches of regions path at home as well.

Times are MSK (UTC+3), as listed by RFU (local times, if different, are in parentheses).

RPL path

Regions path

Stage 1

Stage 2 
The draw was held on 2 March 2023 at 14:25 MSK live on TV-channel «Match TV».

Semi-finals

RPL path 
The draw was held on 2 March 2023 at 14:25 MSK live on TV-channel «Match TV».

Regions path 
The draw was held on 17 March 2023 at 13:35 MSK live on TV-channel «Match TV».

Stage 1

Stage 2

Path finals

RPL path

Regions path

Stage 1

Stage 2

Final

References

External links
 Official page
 Page on Russian Football Union website 

Russian Cup seasons
Cup
Russian Cup